Schiffornis is a genus of bird in the family Tityridae. It has traditionally been placed in the manakin family, but evidence strongly suggest it is better placed in Tityridae, where now placed by SACC. Instead of schiffornis, they are sometimes referred to as mourners; a name shared with members of the genera Laniocera, Laniisoma and Rhytipterna.

Species

References

 
Bird genera
Taxa named by Charles Lucien Bonaparte
Taxonomy articles created by Polbot